The Cross at the Crossroads, known as The Cross to locals, is a  tall cross in Effingham, Illinois. It was built in 2001 after its creator was inspired by a similar cross in Groom, Texas.

References

External links
 The Cross Foundation

Monuments and memorials in Illinois
Monumental crosses in the United States